Jyrki Tapani Ponsiluoma (born 5 December 1966) is a Swedish cross-country skier, born in Kurikka, Finland, who competed from 1989 to 1995. He finished eighth in the 30 km event at the 1992 Winter Olympics in Albertville.

Career
Ponsiluoma's best World Cup career finish was fifth in a 15 km event in the Soviet Union in 1989 which was also his best individual career finish.

Cross-country skiing results
All results are sourced from the International Ski Federation (FIS).

Olympic Games

World Cup

Season standings

Team podiums
1 podium

Personal life
He lives in Östersund with his family. His son Martin is a biathlete representing Sweden at international level.

References

External links

1966 births
Living people
People from Kurikka
Finnish emigrants to Sweden
Swedish people of Finnish descent
Cross-country skiers at the 1992 Winter Olympics
Swedish male cross-country skiers
Olympic cross-country skiers of Sweden